Humenyuk or Gumenyuk, traditionally transliterated as Humeniuk, Gumeniuk or Goumeniouk, is a Ukrainian surname. The Humenyuk surname may refer to:
 Kateryna Humenyuk (known as Assol, born 1994), Ukrainian singer
 Irina Gumenyuk (born 1988), Russian triple jumper
 Marianne Humeniuk (born 1947), Canadian former swimmer
 Pawlo Humeniuk (born c. 1884), Ukrainian-American fiddler
 Scott Humeniuk (born 1969), retired professional ice hockey player
 Walter Humeniuk (born  1924), goaltender for the Detroit Red Wings and the Chicago Black Hawks
 Oleh Humenyuk (born 1983), Ukrainian football midfielder
 Oleksandr Humenyuk (born 1976), Ukrainian football coach and former player
 Vasyl Humenyuk (born 1946), Ukrainian politician
 Natalia Humeniuk (born 1983), Ukrainian journalist

See also
 
 
 

Ukrainian-language surnames